Ramez Al-Khayyat is a Qatari businessman based in Doha. He is the Vice Chairman and Group CEO of Power International Holding, a Qatari-based conglomerate which operates across general contracting, real estate, food and agriculture, hospitality, and services.

Career 
Al-Khayyat started his career as a board member of Al-Khayyat Contracting and Trading, a family business established by his father Mohamad Reslan Al-Khayyat in 1983.

In 2011, Al-Khayyat co-founded UrbaCon Trading & Contracting with his brother Moutaz Al-Khayyat, a large construction company in Qatar. It has undertaken several large development projects including the Banana Island resort, the Mall of Qatar and Lekhwiya Sports Complex, which will be used as part of the 2022 Football World Cup. Al-Khayyat serves as its Managing Director.

Al-Khayyat is the Managing Director of Baladna Food Industries, Qatar’s largest dairy and beverage producer which provides 95% of the country's dairy products. Baladna rose to prominence during the Qatar diplomatic crisis when the company airlifted cows from other countries into Qatar to bypass the Saudi blockade. In 2021, Al-Khayyat announced that the company was exporting to 11 countries and expanding its range of cheeses, juices and milk products.

In 2016, Al-Khayyat received the Retail Leadership Award for the Mall of Qatar development at the Asia Retail Congress Awards.   

In April 2022, Al-Khayyat was appointed Vice Chairman of Estithmar Holding QPSC, a public company on the Qatar Stock Exchange. He is the Managing Director of Aura Group, a company that operates in the food and beverage sector in Qatar, and Assets, a Qatar-based real estate company.

In September 2022, Power International Holding was listed by Forbes in the Middle East's Top 100 Arab Family Businesses, ranking thirteenth.

References

External links 
 UrbaCon Trading & Contracting
 Baladna Food Industries
 Power International Holding

Living people
1983 births
People from Doha
Qatari businesspeople